Patrick Walsh may refer to:
Patrick Walsh (bishop of Down and Connor) (born 1931), Irish Roman Catholic prelate
Patrick Walsh (bishop of Waterford and Lismore) (died 1578), Irish Roman Catholic prelate
Patrick Walsh (friar), Irish ambassador and friar
Patrick Walsh (investor) (born 1975), investor and entrepreneur
Patrick Walsh (Michigan politician) (1892–1978), Democratic Member of the Michigan state senate, 1949–1954
Patrick Walsh (piper) (fl. 19th century), Irish musician
Patrick Walsh (Southern U.S. politician) (1840–1899), Irish-born American politician and journalist
Patrick Walsh (Wisconsin politician) (1830–1888), member of the Wisconsin Senate from Milwaukee County
Patrick C. Walsh, American urologist
Patrick J. Walsh (FDNY Commissioner) (1873–1946), Fire Commissioner of the City of New York
Patrick Joseph Walsh (1908–1942), United States Navy officer and Silver Star recipient
Patrick M. Walsh (born 1955), United States Navy admiral
Paddy Walsh (1906–1988), Australian rules footballer

See also
Pat Walsh (disambiguation)